Arundel Castle is a restored medieval castle.

Arundel Castle may also refer to:

 Arundel Castle Cricket Ground, a cricket ground in Arundel, England
 , a number of steamships with this name